Joanne Meyerowitz is an American historian and author. She was a professor at Indiana University and the University of Cincinnati before becoming editor of the Journal of American History from 1999 to 2004. Following her tenure there, she accepted a position at Yale University, where she was subsequently appointed the Arthur Unobskey Professor of History. Her work has appeared in the American Historical Review, Gender & History, the Journal of Women's History, and the Bulletin of the History of Medicine.

Meyerowitz is a graduate of the University of Chicago and Stanford University. Her book How Sex Changed: A History of Transsexuality in the United States received the Israel Fishman Non-Fiction Award as part of the 2003 Stonewall Book Awards. She has also been awarded a Guggenheim Fellowship, a National Endowment for the Humanities Fellowship, and a Social Science Research Council fellowship. She is a former trustee of the Kinsey Institute.

Bibliography
Women Adrift: Independent Wage Earners in Chicago, 1880-1930 (1988)
Not June Cleaver: Women and Gender in Postwar America, 1945-1960 (1994) (as editor)
How Sex Changed: A History of Transsexuality in the United States (2002)
History and September 11th (2003)

References

21st-century American historians
American LGBT writers
Historians of LGBT topics
Living people
Indiana University faculty
University of Cincinnati faculty
American magazine editors
Yale University faculty
University of Chicago alumni
Stanford University alumni
Year of birth missing (living people)
American women historians
21st-century American women writers
Women magazine editors
Stonewall Book Award winners
History journal editors